Reuben Terrell Wood (August 7, 1884 – July 16, 1955) was a Democratic Representative representing Missouri's 6th congressional district from March 4, 1933 to January 3, 1941.

Wood was born on a farm near Springfield, Missouri, apprenticed as a cigar maker and was president of the Missouri State Federation of Labor 1912-1932. He was chairman of the Committee on War Claims and lost re-election in 1940. He resumed his position as president of the Federation until his retirement in 1953. He is buried in Greenlawn Cemetery in Springfield.

References

1884 births
1955 deaths
People from Greene County, Missouri
Democratic Party members of the United States House of Representatives from Missouri
20th-century American politicians